Milad Nouri may refer to:

Milad Nouri (footballer, born 1993), Iranian football midfielder
Milad Nouri (footballer, born 1986), Iranian football midfielder